The 2007 NHK Trophy was the final event of six in the 2007–08 ISU Grand Prix of Figure Skating, a senior-level international invitational competition series. It was held at the Sendai City Gymnasium in Sendai on November 28 – December 2. Medals were awarded in the disciplines of men's singles, ladies' singles, pair skating, and ice dancing. Skaters earned points toward qualifying for the 2007–08 Grand Prix Final.

Results

Men

Ladies

Pairs

Ice dancing

External links

 
 Official site
 2007 NHK Trophy at ISU
 Starting Orders and Results

Nhk Trophy, 2007
NHK Trophy